Noi Acharayangkun (5 July 1822 – 16 October 1891), known by the noble title Phraya Sisunthonwohan, was a Thai writer and scholar. He is best known for writing the first modern textbooks on the Thai language, the  series.

Life
Noi was born in Chachoengsao in 1822. At the age of thirteen, he ordained as a novice monk at Wat Saket in Bangkok, where he studied language and scripture under several learned monks. He joined the sangha after reaching the age of full ordination of twenty, and remained at the monastery for another eleven years before leaving the monkhood. He then took up a career in the royal court of King Mongkut (Rama IV, r. 1851–1868), receiving the title Khun Prasitaksorasat and later becoming head of the Aksonphimphakan royal press. Under King Chulalongkorn (Rama V, r. 1868–1910), he became the head of the Royal Scribes' Department, assuming the titles Khun Saraprasoet and later Phraya Sisunthonwohan, and also served as court poet, producing a large output of poetry. He was known as an expert authority on the Thai language, and wrote several textbooks, the first of which, Munlabot Banphakit, was published in 1871. He became head of the palace school, which Chulalongkorn established to pioneer modern education in the country, and taught the royal children, including Crown Prince Vajirunhis and the future king Vajiravudh. He was named to the Privy Council in 1887, and served until his death in 1891.

Notes

References

Thai writers
Thai educators
Thai poets
Phraya
1822 births
1891 deaths